Prior to its uniform adoption of proportional representation in 1999, the United Kingdom used first-past-the-post for the European elections in England, Scotland and Wales. The European Parliament constituencies used under that system were smaller than the later regional constituencies and only had one Member of the European Parliament each.

The constituency of London South was one of them.

When it was created in England in 1979, it consisted of the Westminster Parliament constituencies of Carshalton, Croydon Central, Croydon North East, Croydon North West, Croydon South, Mitcham and Morden, Sutton and Cheam, Wimbledon. However, from 1984 onwards it was merged into London South and Surrey East, having been combined with half of the former Surrey Constituency.

Members of the European Parliament

Election results

References

External links
 David Boothroyd's United Kingdom Election Results

South
20th century in London
1979 establishments in England
1984 disestablishments in England
Constituencies established in 1979
Constituencies disestablished in 1984